Adiantum fengianum is a species of maidenhair fern endemic to China.  Its natural habitat is temperate forests. It is threatened by habitat loss.

References

fengianum
Flora of China
Endangered plants
Taxonomy articles created by Polbot
Taxa named by Ren-Chang Ching